Dingja is a small village in the municipality of Gulen in Vestland county in Western Norway. The lake Dingevatn lies directly to the east of the village, and the island of Hiserøyna lies just offshore to the southwest.

Dinja is home to about 40 inhabitants in the wintertime, but the population grows in summer. Due to the beautiful nature, many people from Bergen come visiting their cabins in the regions nearby, or stop by in their boats. There is also a tiny grocery store.

References

Villages in Vestland
Gulen